Concepción "Cuca" Gamarra Ruiz-Clavijo (born 23 December 1974) is a Spanish politician who is Secretary-General of the People's Party

Biography 
Born on 23 December 1974 in Logroño she earned a licentiate degree in Economic Law from the University of Deusto. Elected as municipal councillor of Logroño, she served as deputy mayor from 2003 to 2007. She became Mayor of Logroño after the 2011 municipal election.

She was re-elected Mayor of Logroño for a second mandate in the 2015 municipal election.

She endorsed Soraya Sáenz de Santamaría vis-à-vis the process for the election of the new PP leader in 2018.

She ran as candidate to the Congress of Deputies in the PP at the April 2019 general election, and was elected deputy. She held her seat at the November 2019 general election.

In August 2020, Pablo Casado chose her as the new spokesperson of the PP's parliamentary group in the Congress of Deputies, replacing Cayetana Álvarez de Toledo.

References 

Members of the 13th Congress of Deputies (Spain)
Members of the 14th Congress of Deputies (Spain)
Mayors of places in Spain
1974 births
Living people